Atriasterinae is a subfamily within  family Microcotylidae and class Monogenea. This subfamily was created by Maillard & Noisy in 1979.

Species
According to the World Register of Marine Species, there are five genera  in this subfamily:

References

Microcotylidae
Monogenea genera